Sinauer Associates, Inc. is a publisher of college-level textbooks. It was started in 1969 by Andrew D. Sinauer and has since grown to be an internationally recognized publisher of seminal scientific works.

References

External links
Official website

Book publishing companies based in Massachusetts
Academic publishing companies
Publishing companies of the United States
Publishing companies established in 1969
1969 establishments in Massachusetts